Algeria will compete at the 2022 World Athletics Championships in Eugene, United States, from 15 to 24 July 2022. Algeria has entered 8 athletes.

Entrants
 including alternates

Men

Track and road events

References

World Championships in Athletics
Algeria at the World Championships in Athletics
Nations at the 2022 World Athletics Championships